Headsman is a fictional character appearing in American comic books published by Marvel Comics. His apparent real name is Cleavon Twain (a play on the words "cleave in twain") though it is unclear if this is his actual birth name or simply an alias.

Fictional character biography

Origin 
Cleavon Twain and his older brother grew up on a chicken farm in Louisiana. There, Cleavon had a pet dog that repeatedly tried to bite his brother. This led him to warn Cleavon that he would kill the dog if he attacks him one more time. Eventually the dog bit his brother and was subsequently killed by him. Cleavon was heart broken, but still looked up to his brother. The brothers later joined a biker gang called the 'Headhunters'. Cleavon states that his brother was the 'badass' of the gang. The Twain brothers had since grown estranged, with Cleavon descending deeper into a life of crime, while his brother returned to life on the farm.

Eventually, Cleavon Twain made his way to New York, where he was tracked down by the Green Goblin (Norman Osborn) and given advanced technology, including a high-tech adamantium vibro-axe that could cut through anything and a hover platform for transportation. He also had a strength boosting harness that made his axe swings even more powerful and deadly. He was sent to help the Enforcers escape from Spider-Man, which he accomplished by forcing Spider-Man to flee. Harry Osborn alerted Spider-Man to the criminals' meeting place, and the Headsman was forced to flee after the ensuing battle after Spider-Man damaged his power pack. After repairing his pack, Headsman teamed with Lucky Lobo to kill Spider-Man. Believing he had killed Spider-Man, he left the hero buried under a pile of rubble. Facing Spider-Man again, he was assaulted by the Green Goblin, who revealed himself to Headsman as his employer. The Green Goblin destroyed the Headsman's equipment and knocked him out, allowing Spider-Man to turn him over to the police.

Thunderbolts 
Many years later, the Headsman joined Osborn's Thunderbolts black ops team. He helped discredit Doc Samson by attacking Air Force One disguised as the Green Goblin. Osborn saved the President in a staged attack by tossing the faux "Green Goblin" from the plane. The team's next objective was to kill Deadpool, at which they failed miserably. His teammate the Ghost revealed to him that the gravity-grip he used on his first mission was faulty and that he had fixed it, suggesting that Osborn had meant for him to die in his fall from the plane. He battled new teammate Mister X, but was spared from death by the Black Widow. When the Thunderbolts capture Songbird and Natasha Romanov, they are ordered to execute them. However, the consciences of Headsman, Ghost and Paladin get the better of them; they allow the prisoners to escape, knocking out their teammates and erasing their memories of the event.

Death 
The Uranian of the Agents of Atlas later implants a suggestion in the mind of Scourge to execute Osborn when he next sees him; after the mission, a hologram of Obsorn appears before the Thunderbolts, which triggers Scourge to shoot, but the bullet passes through the hologram and hits Headsman in the head.

Following the Siege of Asgard, his brother was given his high-tech axe by Ant-Man.

Powers and abilities
The Headsman wears a power pack which enhances his strength. He wields a high-tech adamantium vibro-axe and has a disc-shaped hovercraft for personal transportation. Even without these devices, he possess exceptional strength and endurance for a normal human, and has incredible skill with an axe.

In other media
Headsman appears in the Spider-Woman motion comics, voiced by Jesse Falcon.

References

External links
 Headsman at Marvel.com
 

Characters created by Kurt Busiek
Comics characters introduced in 1996
Fictional axefighters
Fictional mass murderers
Fictional serial killers
Marvel Comics male supervillains
Marvel Comics supervillains